This is a list of elders of the Japan Sumo Association (JSA). More accurately called "elder stock" or toshiyori kabu, these names are a finite number of licenses that can be passed on, and are strictly controlled by the JSA. They allow certain advantageous privileges and there are official criteria for whether or not a retiring wrestler can acquire one. In 1927, the number of licenses was set at 105. For more information see toshiyori.

This list is in approximate order of the current elders' rank in the organization. Members with borrowed kabu are always at the bottom of the hierarchy (aside from consultants) and are listed here with the name of the owner, if known. Elections to the Board of Directors are held every two years; the latest was in March 2022.

List of elders

Explanation of ranks
 rijichō - chairman
 riji - director
 fuku-riji - deputy director
 yakuin taigu iin - special executive
 iin - committee member
 shunin - senior member
 iin taigu toshiyori - elder receiving iin privileges 
 toshiyori  - elder
 sanyo - consultant (elders re-hired as consultant between 65 and 70 years old)

Elders who do not own but borrow their elder names are always toshiyori. They are not allowed to be stablemasters.

Hyōgiin is not a rank but a group of independent councillors who act as a kind of supervisory board for the directors. Initially there were three Internal Councillors (Ōtake, Futagoyama and Minatogawa) and four External Councillors (persons outside the sumo world). The Internal Councillors were ranked as iin prior to taking office and returned to that rank at the conclusion of their four-year term. In March 2018 they were replaced by three former wrestlers who are completely outside the Sumo Association: Fujinokawa, Washūyama and Asanosho.

See also
List of sumo stables

Notes

References
Oyakata (Coaches) List at Japan Sumo Association
The Oyakata Gallery
Heya A-Z

Lists of sumo wrestlers